Auburn is a home rule-class city in Logan County, Kentucky, in the United States. The population was 1,340 at the 2010 census.

History
Originally called Federal Grove, the present name dates from the 1860s; it was named after Auburn, New York, the previous residence of several early settlers. It was originally incorporated by the state assembly in 1865, and reincorporated in 1878.

Geography
Auburn is located at  (36.866523, -86.716910).

Demographics

As of the census of 2000, there were 1,444 people, 584 households, and 397 families residing in the city. The racial makeup of the city was 90.86% White, 6.86% African American, 0.14% Native American, 0.14% Asian, and 2.01% from two or more races. Hispanic or Latino of any race were 0.69% of the population.

There were 584 households, out of which 32.2% had children under the age of 18 living with them, 50.5% were married couples living together, 12.7% had a female householder with no husband present, and 32.0% were non-families. 29.3% of all households were made up of individuals, and 15.4% had someone living alone who was 65 years of age or older. The average household size was 2.36 and the average family size was 2.88.

In the city, the population was spread out, with 23.6% under the age of 18, 8.0% from 18 to 24, 28.8% from 25 to 44, 19.7% from 45 to 64, and 19.8% who were 65 years of age or older. The median age was 38 years. For every 100 females, there were 79.6 males. For every 100 females age 18 and over, there were 76.8 males.

The median income for a household in the city was $30,500, and the median income for a family was $38,173. Males had a median income of $28,365 versus $20,000 for females. The per capita income for the city was $14,779. About 11.3% of families and 15.1% of the population were below the poverty line, including 17.3% of those under age 18 and 18.9% of those age 65 or over.

Education
Auburn has a lending library, a branch of the Logan County Public Library.

Notable people
Floyd Collins, cave explorer, victim of cave accident

See also
 South Union Shaker Center House and Preservatory
 Shaker Museum at South Union

References

External links
 Auburn Historical Society
 Auburn Memories

Cities in Kentucky
Cities in Logan County, Kentucky